Palma di Montechiaro is a town and comune in the province of Agrigento, Sicily, southern Italy. Many Greek archaeological findings have been found near the town.

Formerly known as Palma, in 1863, Montechiaro was added to the name, in honour of the Chiaramonte family whose stronghold is close to the town.

Controversy
In 2002, La Repubblica reported the presence of the prominent Italian politician Angelino Alfano (a Silvio Berlusconi protégé) at the 1996 wedding of the daughter of Croce Napoli (died 2001), believed by investigators to be the Mafia boss of Palma di Montechiaro, as shown on an amateur video of the party. Alfano, then a deputy of the Sicilian Regional Assembly, was greeted with affection by Croce Napoli. Alfano at first told La Repubblica he had "no memory or recollection of this wedding" and that "I never participated in a wedding of Mafia or of their children, I do not know his wife, Gabriella, and I've never heard of Mr. Croce Napoli who was said to be boss of Palma di Montechiaro." Later he said that he remembered that he was actually at the wedding but had been invited by the groom and did not know the bride and her family.

Main sights

Mother Church
Castle
Benedictine Monastery
Ducal Palace
San Carlo Tower
Palazzo degli Scolopi
Ruins of the Baroque church of Santa Maria della Luce
Archaeological park of Zubbia

In popular culture

Palma di Montechiaro  is associated with Italian author Giuseppe Tomasi di Lampedusa.<ref>http://livingagrigento.it/en_GB/Citta/main/citta?id=1254_Palma-di-Montechiaro</ Retrieved 2019-05-01</ref>

New Zealand author James McNeish, who visited Palma di Montechiaro in the early 1960s, describes it as a place of abject poverty, avoided by locals. ‘Its poverty is spectacular. The cavernous streets are scored by serpentines of black faeces and other matter and a veil of chalky dust pollutes the air. From the main road the whole plaster town tilts downwards, as though arrested in a macabre lunge towards the sea. Once I drove through with a woman companion. She looked once, and screamed. She did not speak again until we were some distance outside the township'

Notable people
 

Filippo Sciascia (born 1972), artist

References

Ancient Greek archaeological sites in Italy